Gisèle Pascal (17 September 1921 – 2 February 2007) was a French actress and a former lover of Rainier III, Prince of Monaco.

She was born Gisèle Marie Madeleine Tallone at Cannes, France.  Her first movie role was in 1942's L'Arlésienne.

For six years, she was involved in a relationship with Prince Rainier, and lived together in a villa in Saint-Jean-Cap-Ferrat. Princess Antoinette, Baroness of Massy, Rainier's sister, seeking to obtain the throne of Monaco for her own son, spread malicious rumors that Pascal was incapable of bearing children. A contemplated marriage was called off when a medical examination mistakenly reported that she was infertile. 

Pascal subsequently married actor Raymond Pellegrin on 8 October 1955 and had a daughter, Pascale Pellegrin, on 12 September 1962.

Stage credits
 Amour, Délices et orgues (also known as Collège Swing)  (1947)
 Véronique (1949)
 Boum sur Paris (1954)

Partial filmography

 L'Arlésienne (1942) - Vivette
 The Beautiful Adventure (1942) - Hélène de Trévillac
 Two Timid Souls (1943) - Une des jeunes filles
 La Vie de bohème (1945) - Musette
 Lunegarde (1946) - Élisabeth de Lunegarde
 Madame et son flirt (1946) - Claudette Sauvaget
 Les J3 (1946) - Mademoiselle Bravard - la prof de philo
 Dropped from Heaven (1946) - Madeleine
 Amours, délices et orgues (1947) - Micheline
 Last Refuge (1947) - Antoinette Baron
 After Love (1947) - Germaine By
 Mademoiselle Has Fun (1948) - Christine Gibson
 La femme nue (1949) - Loulou
 The Chocolate Girl (1949) - Benjamine Lapistolle
 Véronique (1950) - Estelle
 Beautiful Love (1951) - Suzanne Gérard-Moulin
 Endless Horizons (1953) - Hélène Boucher
 Boum sur Paris (1953) - Giselle Pascal
 Royal Affairs in Versailles (1954) - Louise de la Vallière
 Marchandes d'illusions (1954) - Marie-Thérèse Langeac
 Le Feu dans la peau (1954) - Thérèse Rabou
 Madonna of the Sleeping Cars (1955) - Lady Diana Wyndham
 Mademoiselle from Paris (1955) - Micheline Bertier
 If Paris Were Told to Us (1956) - Comtesse de G...
 Pity for the Vamps (1956) - Jany Cristal-Davis
 Sylviane de mes nuits (1957) - Gaby Lemontier
 Ça n'arrive qu'aux vivants (1959) - Anne Brunier
 Le Masque de fer (1962) - Mme de Chaulmes
 Seul... à corps perdu (1964) - Lydia Simon
 Secret World (1969) - Florence
 Un caso di coscienza (1970) - Rosaria
 At the Top of the Stairs (1983) - Rose
 Les Compères (1983) - Louise
 The Public Woman (1984) - Gertrude
 Juillet en septembre (1988) - Madame Dewacker

References

External links
 Obituary in The Independent
 
 
Gisèle Pascal at Allmovie

1921 births
2007 deaths
People from Cannes
French stage actresses
French film actresses
20th-century French actresses